"(You Lift Me) Up to Heaven" is a song recorded by American country music artist Reba McEntire.  It was released in June 1980 as the first single from the album Feel the Fire.  The song reached #8 on the Billboard Hot Country Singles & Tracks chart.  It was written by Johnny MacRae, Bob Morrison, Bill Zerface and Jim Zerface.

McEntire promoted the song by singing it on famous television shows in 1980 including Hee Haw and Pop Goes The Country.  She also sang it at the 1980 Academy of Country Music Awards.

Content
The singer describes her lover as lifting her up to Heaven.  She compares the experience as taking her higher than the mountains of Colorado.

Chart performance

References

1980 singles
Reba McEntire songs
Song recordings produced by Jerry Kennedy
Mercury Records singles
Songs written by Johnny MacRae
1980 songs
Songs written by Bob Morrison (songwriter)
Songs about Colorado